Godfrey Ramsey H. Grayson (1913, Birkenhead, Cheshire – 1998, Kingston upon Thames, Surrey) was an English film director.

Selected filmography
 Doctor Morelle (1949)
 Meet Simon Cherry (1949)
 The Adventures of PC 49 (1949)
 What the Butler Saw (1950)
 The Lady Craved Excitement (1950)
 Room to Let (1950)
 To Have and to Hold (1951)
 Innocent Meeting (1949)
 The Fake (1953)
  Black Ice (1957)
 Woman's Temptation (1959)
 An Honourable Murder (1960)
 The Spider's Web (1960)
 The Pursuers (1961)
 The Durant Affair (1962)
 She Always Gets Their Man (1962)
 The Lamp in Assassin Mews (1962)
 The Battleaxe (1962) 
 Design for Loving (1962)

References

External links

1913 births
1998 deaths
English film directors